Marneral synthase is an enzyme with systematic name (3S)-2,3-epoxy-2,3-dihydrosqualene mutase (cyclizing, marneral-forming). This enzyme catalyses the following chemical reaction

 (3S)-2,3-epoxy-2,3-dihydrosqualene  marneral

Marneral is a triterpenoid formed by Grob fragmentation of the A ring of 2,3-epoxy-2,3-dihydrosqualene during cyclization.  This aldehyde gains its name from its structural similarity to a class triterpenes commonly found in members of the Iridaceae, originally identified by Dr. Franz-Josef Marner

This enzyme is a member of a metabolic gene cluster along with two other cytochrome P450s.

References

External links 
 

EC 5.4.99